Lu Qi (born 21 August 1953) is a Chinese actor.

He has won the Hundred Flowers Award for Best Actor, Huabiao Award for Best Actor, and received Golden Rooster Award for Best Actor and Golden Phoenix Award.

Biography
Lu was born in Ganluo County, Liangshan Yi Autonomous Prefecture, Sichuan on August 21, 1953. He joined the People's Liberation Army during his early years, then he became an actor in Sichuan People's Art Theatre, later, he was transferred to August First Film Studio.

In 2012, Lu recruited a student Miu Xiaoquan.

Filmography

Television

Film

Awards

References

1953 births
Male actors from Sichuan
Living people
Chinese male film actors
Chinese male television actors